A salad bowl or tossed salad is a metaphor for the way a multicultural society can integrate different cultures while maintaining their separate identities, contrasting with a melting pot, which emphasizes the combination of the parts into a single whole. In Canada this concept is more commonly known as the cultural mosaic or "tossed salad".

In the salad bowl model, different cultures are brought together—like salad ingredients—but do not form together into a single homogeneous culture; each culture keeps its own distinct qualities. This idea proposes a society of many individual cultures, since the latter suggests that ethnic groups may be unable to preserve their heritage.

New York City can be considered as being a "salad bowl". A European example is its policy for "integration of non-European nationals", which finances and promotes integration initiatives targeting those who are not members of the European Union. This project aims to encourage dialogue in civil society, develop integration models, and spread and highlight the best initiatives regarding integration. 

The salad bowl idea in practice has its supporters and detractors. Supporters argue that being "American" does not inherently tie a person to a single culture, though rather to citizenship and loyalty to the United States. Thus, one does not need to abandon their cultural heritage in order to be considered "American". Critics tend to oppose the idea in tandem with other critiques on multiculturalism, saying that America needs to have a common culture in order to preserve a common national identity.

See also
Multiculturalism in Canada

References

Sources 
Lind, Michael. The Next American Nation: The New Nationalism and the Fourth American Revolution. 1996
Schmidt, Alvin J. The Menace of Multiculturalism: Trojan Horse in America. 1997
Huntington, Samuel P. Who Are We?: The Challenges to America's National Identity. 2005
Chua, Amy. Day of Empire: How Hyperpowers Rise to Global Dominance and Why They Fall. 2007 
Kolb, Eva. The Evolution of New York City's Multiculturalism: Melting Pot or Salad Bowl. 2009

American culture
English phrases
Political metaphors
Canadian culture
Cultural politics
Cultural concepts
Sociological terminology
Metaphors referring to food and drink
Multiculturalism